Ralph Gray (ca 1740 – December 27, 1813) was a seigneur, businessman and political figure in Lower Canada.

He was born during or before 1740, probably in Scotland, and came to North America during the Seven Years' War, serving in Major-General Jeffery Amherst's troops. He was wounded at the Battle of the Plains of Abraham. After the war, he set up shop as a tailor in the town of Quebec. Some time afterwards, he married Mary Ann Scott. In 1774, he purchased the sub-fief of Grandpré from William Grant. Gray expanded into importing and opened a wholesale outlet. He retired from business in 1778. In 1789, he became part-owner of a toll bridge over the Saint-Charles River. Gray was a shareholder of the Union Hotel at Quebec. In 1808, he was elected to the Legislative Assembly of Lower Canada for Quebec; he was reelected in 1809. He opposed measures taken to declare Pierre-Amable de Bonne ineligible to sit in the assembly after de Bonne became a judge. In 1810, Gray married Phoebe Wallen, the widow of James Frost, after the death of his first wife. They separated in 1813.

He died at Beauport in 1813.

External links
 

1813 deaths
Gray, Ralphstar
Year of birth uncertain
Scottish emigrants to Canada
1740 births